Coffea canephora (syn. Coffea robusta, commonly known as robusta coffee) is a species of coffee that has its origins in central and western sub-Saharan Africa. It is a species of flowering plant in the family Rubiaceae.  Though widely known as Coffea robusta, the plant is scientifically identified as Coffea canephora, which has two main varieties, robusta and nganda.

Coffea robusta represents between 40% and 45% of global coffee production, with Coffea arabica constituting most of the remainder. There are several differences between the composition of coffee beans from C. arabica and C. robusta. Beans from C. robusta tend to have lower acidity, more bitterness, and a more woody and less fruity flavor compared to C. arabica beans.

Description 

Robusta is a species of flowering plant in the family Rubiaceae. Though widely known by the synonym Coffea robusta, the plant is currently scientifically identified as Coffea canephora, which has two main varieties, C. c. robusta and C. c. nganda. The plant has a shallow root system and grows as a robust tree or shrub to about 10 m tall. It flowers irregularly, taking about 10–11 months for berries to ripen, producing oval-shaped beans.

The robusta plant has a greater crop yield than that of arabica, contains more caffeine (2.7% compared to arabica's 1.5%), and contains less sugar (3–7% compared to arabica's 6–9%). As it is less susceptible to pests and disease, robusta needs much less herbicide and pesticide than arabica.

Native distribution 
C. canephora grows indigenously in Western and Central Africa from Liberia to Tanzania and south to Angola. It was not recognized as a species of Coffea until 1897, over a hundred years after Coffea arabica. It is also reportedly naturalized in Borneo, French Polynesia, Costa Rica, Nicaragua, Jamaica and the Lesser Antilles. In 1927 a hybrid between robusta and arabica was found in Timor. This strain was subsequently used to breed rust-resistant plants.

Cultivation and use 

Coffee made from beans of the Coffea canephora plant has low acidity and high bitterness, often with a distinct woody and nutty taste. C. canephora beans, widely known by the synonym Coffea robusta, are used primarily in instant coffee, espresso, and as a filler in ground coffee blends.

Robusta has its origins in central and western sub-Saharan Africa. It is easy to care for, has a greater crop yield, has almost double the amount of caffeine and more antioxidants, and is less susceptible to disease than arabica coffea. It represents 43% of global coffee production, with arabica constituting the remainder except for the 1.5% constituted by coffea liberica.

It is mostly grown in Vietnam, where French colonists introduced it in the late 19th century, though it is also grown in India, Africa and Brazil, where it is often called conilon. In recent years, Vietnam, which produces mostly robusta, has become the world's largest exporter of robusta coffee, accounting for over 40% of the total production. It surpasses Brazil (25% of the world's production), Indonesia (13%), India (5%), and Uganda (5%). Brazil is still the biggest coffee producer in the world, producing one-third of the world's coffee, though 69% of that is C. arabica.

Since Robusta is easier to care for and has a greater crop yield than C. arabica, it is cheaper to produce. Roasted robusta beans produce a strong, full-bodied coffee with a distinctive earthy flavour, but usually with more bitterness than arabica due to its pyrazine content. Since arabica beans are believed to have smoother taste with more acidity and a richer flavour, they are often considered superior, while the harsher robusta beans are mostly used as a filler in lower-grade coffee blends. However, the powerful flavour can be desirable in a blend to give it perceived "strength" and "finish", noticeably in Italian coffee culture. Good-quality robusta beans are used in traditional Italian espresso blends, at about 10–15%, to provide a full-bodied taste and a better foam head (known as crema). It is also used as a stimulant, diuretic, antioxidant, antipyretic and relieves spasmodic asthma.

See also
Coffea arabica
Coffea charrieriana

References

External links 

Comparison Chart of Robusta to Arabica
Robusta Coffee in Vietnam
The Difference Between Arabica and Robusta?
Jan 2008 ICO break down of all Coffee exports
Jan 2008 ICO break down of Green Coffee exports

canephora
Flora of West Tropical Africa
Flora of West-Central Tropical Africa
Flora of East Tropical Africa
Flora of Angola
Flora of Nigeria
Flora of Sudan
Crops originating from Africa
Plants described in 1897